Fairy Cave may refer to:

 Fairy Cave (Jiangxi)
 Fairy Cave (Colorado), part of the extensive cave system of Glenwood Caverns
 Fairy Cave (Victoria), one of the Buchan Caves
 Fairy Cave (Sarawak), one of the Caves of Malaysia
 Fairy Cave (Bau)
 Fairy Cave (Somerset), one of the Caves of the Mendip Hills
 Dog Hole Cave, Storth, Cumbria, England, also known as Fairy Cave
 Talking Rocks Cavern, Stone County, Missouri, previously known as Fairy Cave